Daniel Deronda is a 1921 British silent drama film directed by Walter Courtney Rowden and starring Reginald Fox, Ann Trevor and Clive Brook. It is an adaptation of the 1876 novel Daniel Deronda by George Eliot. The short film was made at Teddington Studios by Master Films.

Cast
 Reginald Fox - Daniel Deronda
 Ann Trevor - Mirah Lapidoth
 Clive Brook - Mallinger Grandcourt
 Yolande Duquette - Mrs Glasher
 Dorothy Fane - Gwendolen Harleth

References

External links

1921 films
British historical drama films
1920s historical drama films
Films directed by Walter Courtney Rowden
Films based on British novels
British silent feature films
British black-and-white films
1921 drama films
1920s English-language films
1920s British films
Silent drama films